Alex Edwards (born 14 February 1946) is a Scottish former association football player, who played as a midfielder for Dunfermline, Hibernian and Arbroath.

Jock Stein gave Edwards his league debut just five days after his 16th birthday in February 1962, which made him the second youngest outfield player, after Andy Penman of Dundee, to ever play in a Scottish Football League match. He then featured as a 16-year-old in Dunfermline's famous 6-2 home victory against Valencia in 1962. He then went on to play for Dunfermline in the Scottish Cup Finals of 1965 and 1968, winning the latter.

Hibernian manager Eddie Turnbull signed Edwards for £13,000 in 1971. He combined well on the right side of the Hibs side with John Brownlie. He played in another Scottish Cup Final in 1972, before winning the Scottish League Cup in the following season. Hibs challenged for the league title that season as well, but fell away after Edwards was banned for eight weeks having been booked four times.

Edwards moved on to Arbroath in 1978, before retiring from professional football in 1980.

References

External links 

1946 births
Living people
Footballers from Dunfermline
Association football wingers
Scottish footballers
Dunfermline Athletic F.C. players
Hibernian F.C. players
Arbroath F.C. players
Scottish Football League players
Scotland under-23 international footballers
Scottish Football League representative players